The Calavon (also called le Coulon) is an  long river in the Alpes-de-Haute-Provence and Vaucluse départements, southeastern France. Its source is near Banon. It flows generally west-southwest. It is a right tributary of the Durance into which it flows at Caumont-sur-Durance, near Cavaillon.

Départements and communes along its course
This list is ordered from source to mouth:
Alpes-de-Haute-Provence: Banon, Simiane-la-Rotonde, Oppedette, 
Viens, Vaucluse
Alpes-de-Haute-Provence: Céreste
Vaucluse: Saint-Martin-de-Castillon, Castellet, Saignon, Caseneuve, Apt, Bonnieux, Roussillon, Goult, Ménerbes, Beaumettes, Oppède, Maubec, Robion, Cavaillon, Caumont-sur-Durance

References

External links

Rivers of Alpes-de-Haute-Provence
Rivers of France
Rivers of Vaucluse
Rivers of Provence-Alpes-Côte d'Azur